Bnei Herzliya is a handball club from Herzliya in Israel. Bnei Herzliya competes in the Ligat Winner (men) and Ligat Ha'Al (women).

Women's team

Honours 

 Ligat Ha'Al
 Winners (9) : 2007, 2008, 2009, 2010, 2011, 2012, 2013, 2014, 2016

 Israel Handball Cup
 Winners (10) : 2006, 2007, 2009, 2010, 2011, 2012, 2014, 2015, 2016, 2017

European record

External links

 
 EHF Club profile

Israeli handball clubs
Sport in Herzliya